Derekh (דרך) is the Hebrew word for "path, way". It may refer to:

Derekh Eretz (disambiguation) "the way of the land", a genre of Jewish philosophy
Dorshei Derekh, a Jewish prayer group
Derekh Hamelekh, an Israeli pop song 
 Off the derech, disaffiliation of a Jew from Orthodox Judaism

See also
Derek